Rhododendron argyrophyllum (银叶杜鹃) is a species of flowering plant in the heath family Ericaceae.

Description
The Latin specific epithet argyrophyllum, meaning “silver-leaved”, refers to the silvery-white under-surface (indumentum) of the leaves.

Lower taxa
Several lower taxa are accepted:

Rhododendron argyrophyllum subsp. argyrophyllum
Rhododendron argyrophyllum subsp. nankingense (Cowan) D. F. Chamb.
Rhododendron argyrophyllum subsp. omeiense (Rehder & E. H. Wilson) D. F. Chamb.
Rhododendron argyrophyllum var. glabriovarium M.Y.He

Cultivation
R. argyrophyllum is hardy down to  but like most rhododendron species requires a sheltered position in dappled shade with acid soil that has been enriched with leaf mould.

The cultivar R. argyrophyllum subsp. nankingense 'Chinese Silver' has gained the Royal Horticultural Society’s Award of Garden Merit.

References

argyrophyllum
Flora of China
Plants described in 1886